Paul Humphrey (American football) (1917–2006), center 
 Paul Humphrey, American jazz and R&B drummer
 Paul Humphrey (Canadian musician), singer for band Blue Peter

See also
Paul Humphreys (disambiguation)